Sapnon Ki Rani is a 2015 Indian Kannada romantic drama film directed by A. R. Babu, and stars Srujan Lokesh, Aishwarya Sindhogi and Niranjan Deshpande in the lead roles. The film's music is scored by Dharma Vish.

Cast
 Srujan Lokesh 
 Aishwarya Sindhogi
 Niranjan Deshpande
 Shobharaj
 Ashok
 Tennis Krishna
 Chikkanna
 Mithra

Soundtrack

The film's soundtrack and original score is composed by Dharma Vish who composed Srujan Lokesh's previous venture Aane Pataki too. The soundtrack consists of 4 songs.

Track listing

References

External links
 
Official trailer on Youtube

2015 films
2015 romantic drama films
2010s Kannada-language films
Indian romantic drama films